General Sir Arthur Singleton Wynne,  (5 March 1846 – 6 February 1936) was a senior British Army officer from an Irish background who served as Military Secretary.

Military career
Wynne was commissioned into the 51st Regiment of Foot in 1863. He became adjutant of his regiment in 1868. In 1877, Wynne became Superintendent of Army Signalling during the Iowaki campaign. He served in the Second Anglo-Afghan War from 1878 and was Commander of Field Telegraphs with the Karum Valley Field Force. In 1885 he was awarded the Order of the Medjidie, 3rd Class from the Khedive of Egypt for service in Sudan, and by 1889 he was Deputy Assistant Adjutant General at Army Headquarters. By 1891 Wynne was Assistant Adjutant-General at the Curragh. He joined the General Staff at Malta and then transferred to Aldershot.

Wynne served in the Second Boer War and was made Deputy Adjutant-General for the Natal Field Force in South Africa, and after the Battle of Spion Kop he was given command of the 11th Infantry Brigade in place of General Edward Woodgate, who had been killed. During the Battle of the Tugela Heights in February 1900 Wynne was himself slightly injured, and his command was given to Colonel Walter Kitchener. After recovering, he was appointed in command of the Cape Colony District until his return to the United Kingdom in early 1902. He was mentioned in despatches (including by Lord Kitchener, dated 23 June 1902).

Following his return to the United Kingdom, Wynne was appointed Deputy Adjutant-General to the Forces on 14 May 1902, General Officer Commanding 10th Division within IV Army Corps and General Officer Commanding Eastern District in 1904 and General Officer Commanding 6th Division in 1905. He went on to be Military Secretary in 1906.

In retirement Wynne was promoted general and became Keeper of the Jewel House, holding the office from 1911 to 1917. From 1913 to 1927 he also held the colonelcy of the King's Own Yorkshire Light Infantry. He lived at Haybergill near Warcop in Cumberland and served as Deputy Lieutenant of Westmoreland.

Family 
Wynne's father was John Wynne of Wynnstay, Roebuck, Co. Dublin, Ireland and his mother was Anne Warren, daughter of Admiral Sir Samuel Warren.  He was a great grandson of Owen Wynne (1723-1789) of Hazelwood House, County Sligo. He married Emily Mary Turner, daughter of Charles Turner of Warcop, Westmoreland, on 8 September 1886.  They had three sons:  Owen, Graeme and Arthur all of whom saw service in the British army.

References

|-
 

1846 births
1936 deaths
British Army generals
British Army personnel of the Mahdist War
British Army personnel of the Second Boer War
British military personnel of the Second Anglo-Afghan War
Deputy Lieutenants of Westmorland
King's Own Yorkshire Light Infantry officers
Knights Grand Cross of the Order of the Bath
Masters of the Jewel Office
Recipients of the Order of the Medjidie, 3rd class
People from Warcop
19th-century Anglo-Irish people
20th-century Anglo-Irish people